HMS Mutine was a Doterel-class sloop of the Royal Navy, built at the Devonport Dockyard and launched on 20 July 1880. She became a boom defence vessel at Southampton in 1899 and was renamed Azov in 1904.  She was sold after World War I.

Design
The Doterel class was designed by Nathaniel Barnaby as a development of William Henry White's 1874 .  The graceful clipper bow of the Ospreys was replaced by a vertical stem and the engines were more powerful. The hull was of composite construction, with wooden planks over an iron frame.

Propulsion

Armament
Ships of the class were armed with two 7-inch (90 cwt) muzzle-loading rifled guns on pivoting mounts, and four 64-pounder muzzle-loading rifled guns (two on pivoting mounts, and two broadside). Four machine guns and one light gun completed the weaponry.

Sail plan
All the ships of the class were provided with a barque rig, that is, square-rigged foremast and mainmast, and fore-and-aft sails only on the mizzen mast.

Crew
Mutine would have had a normal complement of 140–150 men.

Construction
Mutine was ordered from Devonport Dockyard and laid down on 7 June 1879.  She was launched on 20 July 1880 and was commissioned on 10 May 1881 at Devonport.

Service
Sloops of the 1880s and beyond were built to an outmoded design specifically to act as guardians of Britain's far-flung maritime empire; their sailing rig gave them enormous range, and their armament was more than sufficient for minor conflicts around the globe.  Mutine was assigned to the Pacific Station, including service in China.

In 1904 Admiral John Fisher (amid great controversy) listed over 90 ships for disposal.  Among those listed as "ships available for subsidiary purposes of war" was Mutine. Converted to a boom defence vessel in 1899, she and her sister Espiegle were assigned to the boom protecting Southampton Water.   Mutine was renamed Azov in March 1904 (Espiegle became Argo at the same time). They worked throughout World War I in this role.

Fate
Azov (ex-Mutine) was sold to C A Beard for breaking on 25 August 1921.

Notes

References

 

1880 ships
Doterel-class sloops
Victorian-era sloops of the United Kingdom
Ships built in Plymouth, Devon